"Look" (also known as "I Ran" and "Untitled Song #1") is an instrumental composed by American musician Brian Wilson for the Beach Boys' never-finished album Smile. Wilson later completed the track as "Song for Children", with new lyrics written by Van Dyke Parks, for the 2004 album Brian Wilson Presents Smile.

Background
"Look" was one of the earliest pieces recorded during the Smile sessions. Musicologist Philip Lambert speculated that some parts of the music possibly evolved from one of the riffs in "Good Vibrations".

Recording
The instrumental track for "Look" was recorded on August 12, 1966 at Western studio. It was titled "Look" on the tape box, but on the AFM sheet, it was logged as "Untitled Song #1" with a runtime of 2:16. The instrumentation featured upright bass, vibraphones, keyboard, French horn, guitars, organs, trombone and woodwind. Take 20 was marked as best.

Capitol Records documentation suggests that, on October 13, all six Beach Boys were involved in a vocal overdubbing session for the track, now logged as "I Ran (Formerly Untitled Song #1)" with a 3:10 runtime. Writing in The Smile Sessions liner notes, Craig Slowinski said that "a tape from that session has not turned up in a search of the Capitol and BRI vaults."

In November, journalist Tom Nolan wrote about Wilson in The Los Angeles Times West:

Brian Wilson Presents Smile
"Look" was later rewritten as "Song for Children" during the assembly of Brian Wilson Presents Smile (2004). According to Darian Sahanaja: "I was moving things around in Pro Tools, putting things together to show Brian. I dropped 'Wonderful' next to 'Look', and we listened to it. Brian's eyes lit up, and he said 'That's it! That's how we'll do it!'"

Van Dyke Parks subsequently supplied lyrics to be sung in overlapping harmony vocals to further establish connections with other tracks on the album, especially those within the second movement, and it was renamed from "Look" to "Song For Children". In this version, the "Twelfth Street Rag" section is not performed. "Song for Children" served as the link between "Wonderful" and "Child Is Father of the Man", thus being the second track of the album's second movement.

Personnel
Per band archivist Craig Slowinski.

The Beach Boys
 Carl Wilson – vocals (sampled from a 1971 recording for The Smile Sessions)

Session musicians (later known as "the Wrecking Crew")

 Hal Blaine – drums
 Jimmy Bond – upright bass
 Frank Capp – bongos, tambourine, glockenspiel
 Ray Caton – trumpet
 Dick Hyde – tuba
 George Hyde – French horn
 Barney Kessel – 12-string electric guitar
 Larry Knechtel – harpsichord
 Al de Lory – grand piano
 Jay Migliori – flute
 Bill Pitman – Danelectro fuzz bass
 Ray Pohlman – Fender bass

References

External links
 

2011 songs
1960s instrumentals
The Beach Boys songs
Song recordings produced by Brian Wilson
Songs written by Brian Wilson
Songs released posthumously
Songs written by Van Dyke Parks